The Special Actions Detachment or DAE is the special operations maritime unit of the Portuguese Navy. It is part of the Portuguese Marine Corps. Raised in 1985, the DAE is one of the smallest special forces units within the Portuguese Armed Forces. It is responsible for conducting special operations, amphibious reconnaissance, combat diving, long-range reconnaissance patrols, combat search and rescue (CSAR), maritime counter-terrorism, demolition operations, covert operations, hostage rescue, boarding operations, counter-piracy, eliminating high-valued targets, guerilla warfare and other missions in support of Portuguese and NATO armed forces. DAE's mission and training are similar to American special forces and it often trains with them.

Organization
The unit is led by a commander, and is subdivided into a command cell and four combat teams. The command cell contains the unit commander, his deputy (a lieutenant commander) and a small staff of eight. The combat teams are composed of ten men: petty officers and seamen and a commanding petty officer.

Selection and training
DAE operatives are drawn from the ranks of marines, all having high operational experience. Due to the nature of its actions, candidate acceptance is extremely restrictive and selective. Only 5–10% of the applicants manage to join the unit.

Upon completion of the basic selection phase prospective recruits then begin the first phase of their training. Phase 1 of their training is conducted at the Navy's combat diver school. Students receive instruction in: basic combat diving techniques, EOD and underwater demolitions.
Candidates who successfully complete the first phase are assigned to the DAE on a probationary status, and begin their second phase of training. Phase 2 instruction includes courses on: escape and evasion techniques, advanced driving, mountaineering, offensive operations, parachuting training and basic English. Once a trainee is permanently assigned to the DAE he will continue to receive various courses of instruction throughout his career.

After this tough selection, COEMAR starts, which lasts 18 weeks and is divided into three phases:

 Technical (7 weeks)
 Combat (3 weeks)
 Tactics (8 weeks)

During and after COEMAR, DAE's military personnel receive training in areas as varied as:

 Special operations
 Combat diving (closed circuit)
 Inactivation of conventional explosive devices – land branch
 Advanced first aid
 Demolitions, mines and traps
 Military parachuting with automatic & manual opening (taken at the Parachute Regiment – Tancos)
 Combat shooting
 Driving tactical vehicles
 Long-range reconnaissance patrols
 IED disarmament
 Sapper
 Communications
 NBC – nuclear, biological and chemical
 Surveillance and counter-surveillance of the battlefield
 Sniper (taught in Lamego at the Special Operations Troops Centre)
 Abandonment of aircraft in immersion
 Shooting
 Hand-to-hand combat
 Mountaineering/rescues
 Fast rope/helicat/rappel
 Jungle warfare

Operations
DAE conducts regular training exercises with its NATO counterparts, including the United States Navy SEALs, Special Naval Warfare Force (FGNE), French Commandos Marine, JW GROM, Lithuanian Special Operations Force as well as the respective naval counter-terrorist units. 

They were deployed to: 

 Angola in 1992;
 Zaire in 1997;
 Guinea-Bissau in 1998;
 East Timor in 2004;
 Democratic Republic of Congo in 2006 (as part of the EUFOR);
 Somalia in 2009;
 Afghanistan in 2013;
 Mali in 2019;
 Lithuania from (2018–2022) (as part of the NATO Assurance Measures)

Equipment

Infantry weapons

Pistols 

 Glock 17 9-mm pistol

Submachine guns 

 Heckler & Koch MP5A3

Assault rifles 

 Heckler & Koch G36KV 5.56 mm
 Heckler & Koch HK416 A5 5.56 mm
 M4 carbine with M203 40 mm grenade launcher

Sniper rifles 

 Heckler & Koch HK417 A2 7.62 mm sniper variant
 AW 7.62 mm sniper rifle
 AWSM .338 LM sniper rifle
 AW50 12.7 mm sniper rifle

Grenade launchers 

 M203 used on M4 carbine

Vehicles 

 Can-Am Traxter HD8
 Mercedes-Benz 24 GD
 Toyota Land Cruiser HZJ73
 Land Rover Defender 90

References

External links 

Special forces of Portugal
Portuguese Navy
Military units and formations established in 1985
1985 establishments in Portugal
Military of Portugal